The 43rd Battalion (Cameron Highlanders of Canada), CEF, was an infantry battalion of the Canadian Expeditionary Force during the Great War.

History 
The 43rd Battalion was authorized on 7 November 1914, gazetted 18 December, and embarked from Montreal for Britain on HMTS Grampian 1 June 1915. After arrival at Davenport, England, they proceeded by train to Lower St. Martin's Plains, Shorncliffe, arriving late at night 9 June 1915.  The Battalion was briefly designated a Reserve Battalion to absorb casualties from the 15th and 16th Battalions of the 1st Division.  Winter was spent in huts at East Sandling.  It disembarked in France on 22 February 1916, where it fought as part of the 9th Canadian Brigade, 3rd Canadian Division in France and Flanders until the end of the war. The 43rd returned home on the SS Baltic from Liverpool to Halifax, 20 March and after a civic welcome celebration, they were demobilized 24 March 1919.  The battalion was disbanded on 30 August 1920.

The 43rd Battalion recruited in and was mobilized at Winnipeg, Manitoba.

The 43rd Battalion had five officers commanding:
Lt-Col. R. MacD. Thomson, 1 June 1915 – 8 October 1916 (wounded, then killed by shellfire near Courcelette, France, Battle of the Somme)
Lt.-Col. W. Grassie, DSO, 9 October 1916 – 4 November 1917 (he subsequently returned to Canada and resigned his commission in 1918)
Lt.-Col. W.K. Chandler, 4 November 1917 – 23 December 1917
Lt-Col. H.M. Urquart, DSO, MC, 23 December 1917 – 16 August 1918 (wounded during the attack against Fresnoy-les-Roye, France, Battle of Amiens)
Lt.-Col. W.K. Chandler, DSO, 16 August 1918-Demobilization

One member of the 43rd Battalion was awarded the Victoria Cross. Lieutenant Robert Shankland was presented with the Victoria Cross for his intelligence report and observations at Bellevue Spur, Battle of Passchendaele on 26 October 1917. He had previously been awarded the Distinguished Conduct Medal as a sergeant for leading a stretcher bearer party at Sanctuary Wood in June 1916.

The first Chaplain attached to the battalion was the Reverend Charles William Gordon, who held the rank of Captain, then Major, senior chaplain to the 9th Canadian Brigade.  He was well-known throughout Canada as novelist "Ralph Connor."  Gordon returned to Canada after the Battle of the Somme.  His replacement was Captain George C.F. Pringle who had spent many years in the Klondike.

Perhaps the luckiest of original officers was Major Bartholomew Charlton, formerly with the 79th Overseas Draft, who was wounded five times but returned with the battalion in 1919.

Battle honours 
The 43rd Battalion was awarded the following battle honours:
MOUNT SORREL
SOMME, 1916
Flers-Courcelette
Ancre Heights
ARRAS, 1917, '18
Vimy, 1917
HILL 70
Ypres 1917
Passchendaele
AMIENS
Scarpe 1918
Drocourt-Quéant
HINDENBURG LINE
Canal du Nord
PURSUIT TO MONS
FRANCE AND FLANDERS, 1916-18

Perpetuation 
The 43rd Battalion (Cameron Highlanders of Canada), CEF, is perpetuated by The Queen's Own Cameron Highlanders of Canada.

See also 

 List of infantry battalions in the Canadian Expeditionary Force

References

Sources
The Queen's Own Cameron Highlanders of Canada, Twenty-Fifth Anniversary Souvenir, ed. by Lt-Col. J.D. Sinclair, Winnipeg, Manitoba, 1935
Canadian Expeditionary Force 1914-1919 by Col. G.W.L. Nicholson, CD, Queen's Printer, Ottawa, Ontario, 1962
Postscript To Adventure, the Autobiography of Ralph Connor by Charles W. Gordon, Hodder and Stoughton, London, 1938; reprinted McClelland and Stewart, Toronto, 1975
Tillicums of the Trail by George C.F. Pringle, McClelland and Stewart, Toronto, 1922
Adventures in Service by George C.F. Pringle, McClelland and Stewart, Toronto, 1929

043
Military units and formations of Manitoba
Queen's Own Cameron Highlanders of Canada